Steve Welch is a Pennsylvania businessman who ran as a Republican for the United States Senate in the 2012 election, losing to Tom Smith in the primary.

Welch was endorsed by Governor Corbett, State Republican Party, Philadelphia Inquirer and Pittsburgh Post Gazette.

Welch was raised in Chester County, Pennsylvania, where he still resides in the borough of Malvern.  Welch, a former Democrat, graduated from Unionville High School and earned an engineering degree from Penn State University.

In 2001, he founded a pharmaceutical company, Mitos, that made flu vaccines more efficient.  Welch sold Mitos to Parker Hannifin in July 2007.

He later founded two other companies, DreamIt Ventures, which helps new businesses get started, and KinderTown, an educational technology business.

In 2013 Welch sold KinderTown to Demme Learning.

Forbes ranked DreamIt Ventures the number 3 accelerator in the world.

In 2015 Welch and friend, Jim Donnelly, co-founded Restore Cryotherapy  to provide whole body cryotherapy, IV infusion and compression therapy directly to the consumer in retail outlets.  In 2015 they opened locations in Austin, TX and Charlotte, NC but were planning to open more stores in 2016.

Since moving to Austin, TX in 2013 Steve has become known for his volunteer work in early childhood education.  Steve has helped build the Steiner Ranch Math Pentathlon program and led several Destination Imagination teams to States and Global finals,.

While Steve is known for his work in early childhood education he also worked with children's hospitals including Children Hospital of Philadelphia to help these organizations innovate more quickly to provide the life saving products and services to the pediatric market.

References

Living people
American businesspeople
Year of birth missing (living people)